Ghazi Abderrazzak (born 16 October 1986) is a Tunisian footballer for US Ben Guerdane on loan from Club Africain.

References

External links
Ghazi Abderrazzak at Footballdatabase

1986 births
Living people
Tunisian footballers
Tunisian expatriate footballers
Association football defenders
ES Hammam-Sousse players
Ohod Club players
Étoile Sportive du Sahel players
Club Africain players
US Ben Guerdane players
Saudi Professional League players
Tunisian Ligue Professionnelle 1 players
Expatriate footballers in Saudi Arabia
Tunisian expatriate sportspeople in Saudi Arabia